Rossiter is a surname, and may refer to:

 Brian Rossiter, whose death led to an investigation with the Irish state paying damages to his family
 Clinton Rossiter, historian, political scientist and author
 Edward Rossiter, a soldier in the Parliamentarian army
 H. Rossiter, a football player
 James Rossiter, a race car driver
 James Patrick Rossiter, lawyer and former mayor of Erie, Pennsylvania
 Jordan Rossiter (born 1997), an English professional footballer
 Keith Rossiter, an Irish hurling player
 Kyle Rossiter, a Canadian ice hockey player
 Leonard Rossiter, a British actor
 Margaret W. Rossiter, American historian of science
 Richard Alfred Rossiter, astronomer, known for the Rossiter–McLaughlin effect
 Ryan Rossiter, an American basketball player
 Stuart Rossiter, philatelist.
 Thomas Prichard Rossiter, an American portrait and historical painter

See also
 Rossiter, Pennsylvania, USA

Welsh-language surnames